Jerome Cogburn "Jerry" Taylor (born August 2, 1963) is an American environmental activist, policy analyst, and game designer. Taylor cofounded the Niskanen Center, a Washington, D.C. based think tank that, among other things, advocates for market environmentalism and the adoption of a carbon tax system to combat global warming.

Early life and education

Taylor attended the University of Iowa as a political science major. As a student, Taylor became an editor of the Hawkeye Review, a conservative student newspaper that served as an alternative to the Daily Iowan, and founded “Students for Traditional American Freedoms”, a conservative activist group.

Career
Before founding the Niskanen Center in 2014, Taylor was a senior fellow at the Cato Institute, where he previously espoused a skeptical position on environmental issues. Taylor's case is a prominent example of a former climate-change skeptic who came to embrace policies to address climate change after researching the scientific consensus behind man-made global warming.
During the 1990s and 2000s Taylor made regular media appearances as a global warming skeptic, including on Penn and Teller's show Bullshit as well as a special edition of the John Stossel show devoted to attacking climate science. After being challenged by Joe Romm to fact-check sources, Taylor changed his prior beliefs because "the scientific evidence became stronger and stronger over time."

On September 6 2021, Taylor resigned from the Niskanen Institute. He had been placed on administrative leave by the Institute a few days earlier after the board became aware of him being charged with domestic violence against his wife. Those charges were subsequently dismissed in court.

He is also a board game designer who has released three wargames, Hammer of the Scots, Crusader Rex, and Richard III.

Personal life 
Taylor's brother, James Taylor, is president at the Heartland Institute which opposes addressing climate change.

References

External links
 Gamefest interview with Jerry Taylor 
 
 Cato Institute bio page for Jerry Taylor

1960s births
Living people
American libertarians
Board game designers
University of Iowa alumni
Cato Institute people
American environmentalists
Green thinkers
Sustainability advocates
Climate activists